"Step into a World (Rapture's Delight)" is a song performed by American rapper KRS-One. It was released on March 3, 1997 via Jive Records as a single from his third solo studio album I Got Next. Recording sessions took place at The Hit Factory in New York City. Produced by Jesse West, the song contains a portion of the composition "Rapture" written by Debbie Harry and Chris Stein, and a sample of the Mohawks' "The Champ" written by Harry Palmer.

The single peaked at number 10 in New Zealand, number 24 on the UK Singles Chart and number 70 on the US Billboard Hot 100.

The song was later used in 2002 video game BMX XXX, in Seth Rogen's 2013 movie This Is the End, in Ian Edelman's 2018 movie The After Party, and in the eighth episode of 2020 miniseries The Last Dance.

Personnel
Lawrence "KRS-One" Parker — rapping vocals, songwriter, arrangement, mixing
Keva Hargrove — lead vocals
Jesse West — songwriter, producer, mixing
"Commissioner Gordon" Williams — engineering
Ted Wohlsen — engineering assistant
Tony Dawsey — mastering
Alexander Maslatzides — design, photography
Simone Allen — photography
Jay Kramer — management
Wesley Powell — management

Charts

References

External links

1997 songs
1997 singles
KRS-One songs
Jive Records singles
Songs written by KRS-One
Songs written by Chris Stein
Songs written by Debbie Harry